The Write One is a Philippine television drama romance fantasy series broadcast by GMA Network. Directed by King Mark Baco, it stars Ruru Madrid and Bianca Umali. It premiered on March 20, 2023, on the network's Telebabad lineup.

Cast and characters
Lead cast
 Ruru Madrid as William "Liam" Herrera
 Bianca Umali as Joycelyn "Joyce" Trinidad-Herra / Savana
Supporting cast
 Mikee Quintos as Victoria "Via" dela Peña
 Paul Salas as Hans Arevalo
 Lotlot de Leon as Tess Herrera 
 Ramon Christopher as Danilo Herrera
 Mon Confiado as Ramon dela Peña
 Art Acuña as Edmond
 Alma Concepcion as Joanne
 Kokoy de Santos as Intoy
 Royce Cabrera as Vergil
 Kaloy Tingcungco as Borj
 Euwenn Mikaell as Dex Herrera
 Analyn Barro as Megan
 Yvette Sanchez as Deedee
 Migs Villasis as Leroy
 Eva Le Queen as Queenie 

Guest cast
 Kian Co as young William Herrera

Production
Principal photography commenced on February 1, 2023.

Episodes

References

External links
 
 

2023 Philippine television series debuts
Filipino-language television shows
GMA Network drama series
Philippine fantasy television series
Philippine romance television series
Television shows set in the Philippines